Fawziya Abdoulkarim (born ) is a Cameroonian volleyball player. She is a member of the Cameroon women's national volleyball team and played for Bafia Evolution in 2014. She was part of the Cameroonian national team at the 2014 FIVB Volleyball Women's World Championship in Italy and at the 2016 Summer Olympics in Rio de Janeiro.

Clubs
  Bafia Evolution (2014-2015)
 France VBC Chamalière (2015-2017)
 France SOC Sens Olympique Club (2017-2020)
 France ESCV Entente Saint-Chamond (2020-2021)
 France  VB Pays Viennois (2022-now)

References

1989 births
Living people
Cameroonian women's volleyball players
Place of birth missing (living people)
Olympic volleyball players of Cameroon
Volleyball players at the 2016 Summer Olympics
Wing spikers
21st-century Cameroonian women